Mastixiodendron stoddardii is a species of plant in the family Rubiaceae. It is found in Papua New Guinea and the Solomon Islands. It is threatened by habitat loss.

References

stoddardii
Vulnerable plants
Taxonomy articles created by Polbot